The Henderson House is a historic U.S. home located in Dumfries, Virginia. Alexander Henderson built this home in the late 18th century near the Old Post Road (King's Highway). Alexander Henderson was the father of Archibald Henderson, fifth Commandant of the Marine Corps. During the American Revolutionary War, the Hendersons entertained many important officers and men in this house. During the American Civil War, both the Confederate and the Union armies used the house as a hospital depending on which occupied the area. A cannonball struck the house during the American Civil War and remained lodged in the west wall for about 100 years until a souvenir hunter stole it the 1960s.

Henderson 
Henderson lived in this house until his death and the house was sold in 1817 shortly after the death of his wife Sally.

Notes

External links
Historic Henderson House (Dumfries, Virginia)

American Civil War hospitals
Houses completed in the 18th century
Houses in Prince William County, Virginia